Auricupride is a natural alloy that combines copper and gold. Its chemical formula is Cu3Au. The alloy crystallizes in the cubic crystal system in the L12 structure type and occurs as malleable grains or platey masses. It is an opaque yellow with a reddish tint. It has a hardness of 3.5 and a specific gravity of 11.5.

A variant called tetra-auricupride (CuAu) exists. Silver may be present resulting in the variety argentocuproauride.

It was first described in 1950 for an occurrence in the Ural Mountains Russia. It occurs as low temperature unmixing product in serpentinites and as reduction "halos" in redbed deposits. It is most often found in Chile, Argentina, Tasmania, Russia, Cyprus, Switzerland and South Africa.

References

External links

National Pollutant Inventory - Copper and compounds fact sheet

Copper alloys
Gold minerals
Native element minerals
Cubic minerals
Minerals in space group 221
Minerals described in 1950